Abby is a given name.

Abby may also refer to:

 Abby (film), a 1974 blaxploitation/horror film about a woman possessed by an African demon
 Abby (TV series), a 2003 television series starring Sydney Tamiia Poitier
 Tropical Storm Abby, three tropical cyclones each in the Atlantic Ocean and Western Pacific Ocean
 Andrew Arthur Abbie (1905-1976), Australian anatomist and anthropologist
 ABBY, former book award of the American Booksellers Association, now called the Indies Choice Book Awards

See also
 Abbey (disambiguation)
 Aby (disambiguation)
 Abi (disambiguation)
 Abby's, an American sitcom television series